Owl moth is a common name for various types of moths, mainly species in the family Brahmaeidae; it may refer to:

Family Brahmaeidae
 Brahmaea certhia, the Sino-Korean owl moth
 Brahmaea europaea, the European owl moth
 Brahmaea japonica, the Japanese owl moth
 Brahmaea tancrei, the Siberian owl moth
 Brahmaea wallichii

Other moth species
 Anticarsia irrorata
 Cometaster pyrula, the faint owl moth or yin-yang moth
 Thysania zenobia

See also
 Owl butterfly

Animal common name disambiguation pages